The 2018–19 season will be Fudbalski Klub Partizan's 72nd season in existence and the club's 13th competing in the Serbian SuperLiga.

Transfers

In

Out

Players

Squad

Friendlies

Competitions

Serbian SuperLiga

Overview

Regular season

League table

Results by matchday

Results

Championship round

Results by matchday

Results

Serbian Cup

UEFA Europa League

First qualifying round

Second qualifying round

Third qualifying round

Play-off round

Statistics

Goalscorers

Last updated: 23 May 2019

Clean sheets

Last updated: 23 May 2019

Disciplinary record

Last updated: 23 May 2019

Game as captain 

Last updated: 23 May 2019

* Players sold or loaned out during the season

References

External links

 Partizanopedia 2018-19

FK Partizan seasons
Partizan
Partizan